Qalloocan, also spelt Qaloocan  is a town in the Burao District, in the Togdheer region of Somaliland. It is inhabited by the Sanbuur sub-division of the Habr Je'lo Isaaq clan.

References 

Populated places in Togdheer